Karl Axel Georg Detlow von Braun (22 March 1912 – 13 July 1999) was a Swedish Olympic sailor. In the 1936 Summer Olympics, he sailed with the 8-metre Ilderim, helmed by Tore Holm, and finished 4th. He was the son of Georg von Braun.

References

Swedish male sailors (sport)
Olympic sailors of Sweden
8 Metre class sailors
Sailors at the 1936 Summer Olympics – 8 Metre
1912 births
1999 deaths
Royal Swedish Yacht Club sailors